Group 4 is a rugby league competition in the New England and north west area of New South Wales, run under the auspices of the Country Rugby League.

Structure
The Group runs a first grade, reserve grade, league tag and under 18s competitions. All nine first grade clubs run at least one lower grade team and most will have three or four. In addition to the nine first grade clubs, there was also one junior club involved in under 16s: Farrer MAHS. The Under 16s competition has since become a part of the junior league organisation in the region, Group 4 JRL. It also formerly ran a second division competition called the Wests Shield. The second division competition contained stand-alone senior teams from smaller towns within the region, who eventually moved up to first grade in 2018 after a merger between the divisions. Kootingal-Moonbi, Dungowan and Boggabri moved up to being full first grade teams, whilst Manilla and Barraba moved into the reserves competition. Manilla then re-joined the first grade competition in 2022. 

There are also Group 4 senior Under 18s and Under 16s representative teams that competes against other Group sides. They compete against Groups 19 and 21 in trials for the Greater Northern Tigers regional team.

Teams

Current teams
Nine teams currently compete in Group 4 Rugby League first grade, from towns across the New England and north west area of New South Wales. 

The 2020 season was postponed and subsequently cancelled due to the COVID-19 pandemic in Australia. 

First Grade Clubs

There are eight Reserve Grade and Ladies League Tag teams competing in the 2023 season: Werris Creek Magpies, Kootingal-Moonbi Roosters, Gunnedah Bulldogs, Narrabri Blues, Boggabri Kangaroos, Moree Boars, North Tamworth Bears, Dungowan Cowboys, and five Under 18 teams: Dungowan, Narrabri, Gunnedah, Werris Creek and Kootingal-Moonbi.

In Recess

Past teams 
The following teams have competed in Group 4 First Grade since 1983: 
Armidale (2016) (moved back to Group 19)
Barraba (1980s-2021)
Collegians Tamworth (2017) (Returned to junior football only)
Coonabarabran (1998-2009) (moved to Castlereagh)
Inverell (1980s-1989) (moved to Group 19)
Moree Boomerangs (1980s-1990) (moved to Group 19)
Oxley Diggers Tamworth (2014–16) (Folded)
Tamworth City (1956-1995, merged with West Tamworth) 
Tamworth United (1990–91)
Warialda (1980s-1988) (moved to Group 19)
Wee Waa (1900s-1994, 1996-2010, 2012–14, 2017) (In recess)
West Tamworth (1913-1995 as the Robins, merged with Tamworth City 1995-2016), rebranded as South West (2017).
Many of these clubs have moved to Group 19.

These clubs fielded teams in at least one Division 2 competition during the seasons 2011 to 2017. 
Bendemeer (Folded)
Bingara (Folded)
Bundarra (In recess)
Quirindi (moved to Group 21, In recess)
Uralla (amalgamated with Walcha)
Walcha (amalgamated with Uralla)

In 2018, the clubs Boggabri, Dungowan, Kootingal-Moonbi and Werris Creek were elevated from Division 2 into a reorganised First Grade competition. Manilla moved into the lower grades.

Map

Grand finals

Junior League

Current Teams

Notable juniors

Boggabri Kangaroos

Dungowan Cowboys

Gunnedah Bulldogs
John Donnelly (rugby league)
James Wynne
John O’Neill (rugby league)
Lindsay Johnston
Ron Turner (rugby league)

Kootingal-Moonbi Roosters

Narrabri Blues

North Tamworth Bears

See also

Rugby League Competitions in Australia

Sources

References

External links and sources
 Country Rugby League official site
 Group 4 on SportsTG
 Rugby League Week at State Library of NSW Research and Collections

Rugby league competitions in New South Wales
New England (New South Wales)